Good 'n' Country is a studio album by Jim Reeves, released in 1963 on RCA Camden.

Track listing

Charts

References 

1963 albums
Albums produced by Anita Kerr
Jim Reeves albums
RCA Camden albums